Yundian (Mandarin: 云甸镇) is a town in Huili County, Liangshan Yi Autonomous Prefecture, Sichuan, China. In 2010, Yundian had a total population of 15,858: 8,115 males and 7,743 females: 3,200 aged under 14, 11,210 aged between 15 and 65 and 1,448 aged over 65.

References 

Towns in Sichuan
Liangshan Yi Autonomous Prefecture